Irnes is a rare masculine given name which means "Protected Headland" a compound of eir “protection” and nes “headland”.

In Norse mythology, Eir is the goddess associated with healing. She is known to be one of the handmaidens of Frigg, who is wife of Odin, the king of the gods.

See also
Eir - Goddess or valkyrie associated with medical skill

References

Given names
Masculine given names
Scandinavian masculine given names
Swedish masculine given names
Norwegian masculine given names
Danish masculine given names
Icelandic masculine given names
Faroese masculine given names
Croatian masculine given names
Bosnian masculine given names
Montenegrin masculine given names